The IBM 8750 Business Communications System was a voice and data switching system PABX, suitable for medium to large numbers of extensions, used on customer premises." The 8750 was the European version of the IBM 9751, also a ROLM design. 

In 1984, IBM bought the American company ROLM. In 1987 IBM started to market the ROLM-derived IBM 8750 in Austria, Belgium, France, Germany, Italy, Luxemburg, and the UK. Principally for homologation, a few had been installed in IBM locations, such as IBM Havant in England – however none were installed in customer locations.

The 8750 had from 91 to 3000 telephone extensions; up to 1000 simultaneous conversations; a computer based on a Motorola 68020; up to 16 IBM 8755 Operator Consoles; a 30MB fixed disk; main/satellite working with IBM 3750 and 1750 Switching Systems; digital trunks in Belgium, Italy and the UK; and ISDN and Systems Network Architecture (SNA) networks. 

IBM later sold ROLM to Siemens who then continued to market the 8750.

See also
IBM 1750, 2750 and 3750 Switching Systems

References 

Telephone exchange equipment
8750
8750